The Billie Jean King Contribution Award is an annual award granted by the Women's Sports Foundation to an individual or group who has made significant contributions to the development and advancement of women's sports. In 2017, the award was renamed to Billie Jean King Leadership Award.

Past recipients of the Billie Jean King Contribution Award include:
 1980: Dorothy Harris, Bonne Bell, AIAW
 1981: Gladys Heldman, Avon Products, AAU
 1982: NJCAA, Kathrine Switzer, Colgate-Palmolive
 1983: WIBC, Dr. Christine Wells, Coca-Cola
 1984: Personal Products, Girls Club of America, Fred (Delano) Thompson (1933-2019)
 
 1985: McDonald's, David Foster, Boy Scouts of America
 1986: Carole Oglesby
 1987: Eva Auchincloss
 1988: ABC Sports
 1989: A Salute to Women in Sports, Volunteers, Contributors and Staff
 1990: No winner
 1991: Sara Lee Corporation, Dr. Vivan Acosta, Dr. Linda Carpenter
 1992: National Women's Law Center
 1993: Judy Mahle Lutter
 1994: Cappy Productions
 1995: Christine Grant
 1996: Anita DeFrantz
 1997: Alpha Alexander
 1998: Linda Bunker
 1999: Deborah Slaner Larkin
 2000: Charles M. Schulz
 2001: Ladies Professional Golf Association
 2002: Joseph F. Cullman, III
 2003: Nancy Lopez
 2004: Robin Roberts
 2005: No winner
 2006: Dr. Dorothy Gulbenkian Blaney
 2007: Michelle Kwan
 2008: Sony Ericsson WTA Tour
 2009: The Gatorade Company
 2010: John "Launny" Steffens
 2011: Visa
 2012: Birch Bayh
 2013: WNBA
 2014: Tegla Loroupe
 2015: Don Sabo, Ph.D.
 2016: Val Ackerman
 2017: Condoleezza Rice
 2018: Gail Koziara Boudreaux
 2019: Sheila C. Johnson
 2020: Ursula Burns

See also

 List of sports awards honoring women

References

External links
 

Sports awards honoring women
Women's sports in the United States
Awards established in 1980
Women's association football trophies and awards
Women's Sports Foundation